Sergei Yefimovich Zakharov (November 26, 1900, town Alexandrovsk-Sakhalinsky, Sakalin Province of Russian Empire – January 24, 1993, Saint Petersburg, Russian Federation) was a Russian Soviet painter, watercolorist, graphic artist, and interior designer, who lived and worked in Leningrad (current Saint Petersburg). He was a member of the Leningrad Union of Artists, and regarded as one of the brightest representatives of the Leningrad school of painting and graphics, most famous for his watercolors of fruits and flowers.

Biography 
Sergei Yefimovich Zakharov was born November 26, 1900 in the town of Alexandrovsk-Sakhalinsky located on Sakhalin Island near the Tatar Strait on the western shores of Northern Sakhalin at the foot of the Western Sakhalin Mountains.

In 1927 Sergei Zakharov graduated from the Tomsk Institute of Architecture and Construction.

Since 1928 Sergei Zakharov has participated in art exhibitions. He painted still lifes, portraits, landscapes, genre scenes, worked in watercolours, tempera, and monumental painting. In 1930–1950s Sergei Zakharov worked a lot in Soviet Tajikistan, where he designed the interiors of public buildings.

In 1951 Sergei Zakharov was awarded the honorary title of the Honored Art Worker of Tadzhik Republic.

Sergei Zakharov most famous for his watercolors of fruits and flowers, also for paintings devoted to Middle Asia. Sergei Zakharov regarded as an outstanding master of watercolors worked in the technique of watercolor pouring. His personal exhibitions were in Leningrad (1951, 1980, 1984), Saint-Petersburg (1996), and Moscow (1961, 1965).

Sergei Zakharov was a member of the Leningrad Union of Artists since 1938.

Sergei Efimovich Zakharov died in Saint Petersburg in 1993. His paintings and watercolors reside in State Russian Museum, State Tretyakov Gallery, in the lot of Art museums and private collections in the Russia, Italy, England, in the U.S., and throughout the world.

See also

 Fine Art of Leningrad
 Leningrad School of Painting
 List of Russian artists
 List of 20th-century Russian painters
 List of painters of Saint Petersburg Union of Artists
 Saint Petersburg Union of Artists

References

Sources 
 Artists of the USSR. Biography and Bibliography Dictionary. Vol. 4, Part 1. - Moscow: Iskusstvo, 1983. - pp. 254–255.
 Directory of members of the Leningrad branch of Union of Artists of Russian Federation. - Leningrad: Khudozhnik RSFSR, 1987. - p. 47.
 Matthew C. Bown. Dictionary of 20th Century Russian and Soviet Painters 1900-1980s. - London: Izomar, 1998. , .
 Sergei V. Ivanov. Unknown Socialist Realism. The Leningrad School. - Saint Petersburg: NP-Print Edition, 2007. – pp. 244, 245, 363, 382-385, 387-391, 394, 396-398, 400, 401, 411, 413-415, 418-420, 442-444. , .

1900 births
1993 deaths
People from Alexandrovsk-Sakhalinsky District
People from Primorskaya Oblast
20th-century Russian painters
Russian male painters
Soviet painters
Leningrad School artists
Russian watercolorists
Socialist realist artists
Members of the Leningrad Union of Artists
Russian still life painters
20th-century Russian male artists